Pray Now is an album by Karen Peck and New River. It earned the group a Grammy Award nomination for Best Roots Gospel Album in 2016 and won the Southern Gospel Album of the Year at the 2015 Dove Awards.

References

2015 albums
Karen Peck and New River albums